Mavra Mesanychta ("Black Midnight") is a Greek black comedy series, originally broadcast on Mega Channel under the executive production of Frenzy Films. It was written by actor and writer , who also had one of main roles in the comedy, and writer Dimitra Sakalis.

The production manager was Dimitrios Katsaros,
the head of stage design Giannis Doumas, the head of costume design Iliostalachti Vavouli, the director of photography Kostas Palmas, the montage responsible Giannis Maris.

Themes
The series shows how a man can turn "from a sheep into a wolf", how money and power can change people or make them change if they do not have any other choice, and how far people are able to go and what they are willing to do and to lose in order to achieve what they want, no matter the cost they have to pay. It shows the reality of the underworld, what really happens backstage and what most people do not know (or do not want to know) about.

Plot
The story is about mafia and family, kitsch and glamour.

Everything starts when Thrasos, a peaceable breadwinner, inherits the fortune of his brother a man of night and owner of a nightclub that was killed by a bomb in his car. Thrasos suddenly from a low abiding citizen becomes the owner of the 95% of a big nightclub and one of the main heads of the underworld against his will.

Thrasos does not want to take his brothers fortune because of the fear that he might end up just like his brother, but his wife Lena, thirsty for money and luxuries, has other plans and forces him to accept the fortune. However, the ambitious Silvy, the lover of Thrasos' brother for many years, received only 5% of the nightclub, which she is not satisfied with, growing willing to do whatever she can to take the power on her own hands. In all that Thrasos will have to deal with the circumstances, and he will start having problems at work, buying off corrupt police officers to take decisions he does not want to, losing his family with the decisions he has made.

Cast

External links 
 "To Vima"
 "LiveMovies"
 "iShow"

References

Mega Channel original programming
Greek comedy television series
2008 Greek television series debuts
2009 Greek television series endings
2000s Greek television series